Pharnavaz is a Georgian masculine given name.

Other forms of name Pharnavaz used in Georgian are: Pharnaoz or Pharna.

It may refer to:
Pharnavaz I of Iberia, Georgian king
Pharnavaz II of Iberia, Georgian king
Prince Pharnavaz of Georgia, Georgian royal prince
Pharnavaz Chikviladze, Georgian judoka

Georgian masculine given names